In Greek mythology, Hephaestine (Ancient Greek: Ἡφαιστίνης) was one of the various spouses of Aegyptus, king of Egypt. By the latter, she became the mother of the youngest princes: Idas, Daiphron, Pandion, Arbelus, Hyperbius and Hippocorystes. Her sons were wed and slayed by their cousin-wives, daughters of King Danaus of Libya during their wedding night.

According to Hippostratus, Aegyptus had his progeny by a single woman called Eurryroe, daughter of the river-god Nilus. In some accounts, he consorted with Isaie, daughter of his uncle Agenor, king of Tyre.

Notes

References 

 Apollodorus, The Library with an English Translation by Sir James George Frazer, F.B.A., F.R.S. in 2 Volumes, Cambridge, MA, Harvard University Press; London, William Heinemann Ltd. 1921. ISBN 0-674-99135-4. Online version at the Perseus Digital Library. Greek text available from the same website.
Tzetzes, John, Book of Histories, Book VII-VIII translated by Vasiliki Dogani from the original Greek of T. Kiessling's edition of 1826. Online version at theio.com

Women in Greek mythology
Characters in Greek mythology